Mehdi Zobeydi is an Iranian professional football player who currently plays for Iranian football club Sanat Naft Abadan in the Persian Gulf Pro League.

Club career
Zobeydi started his career with Foolad from youth levels. He moved to Foolad Novin in 2012. In Fall 2015, He joined to Esteghlal Khuzestan.

Club career statistics

Honours

Club
Foolad Novin
 Azadegan League (1): 2014–15

Esteghlal Khuzestan
Iran Pro League (1): 2015–16
Iranian Super Cup runner-up: 2016

References

 مهدی زبیدی به نفت مسجدسلیمان پیوست Retrieved in Persian www.farsnews.ir 
مهدی زبیدی به فولادخوزستان پیوست Retrieved in Persian www.varzesh3.com  
زبیدی به نفت مسجد سلیمان پیوست Retrieved in Persian www.tasnimnews.com   
ویدئو: گل دوم صنعت نفت توسط مهدی زبیدی Retrieved in Persian www.ilna.news    
گل اول فولاد به پرسپولیس با ضربه مهدی زبیدی Retrieved in Persian www.mehrnews.com

External links
 Mehdi Zobeydi at IranLeague.ir 

Mehdi Zobeydi  at PersianLeague.com

1991 births
Living people
Iranian footballers
Foolad FC players
Esteghlal Khuzestan players
Pars Jonoubi Jam players
Sportspeople from Khuzestan province
Association football midfielders
Gol Gohar players